Alioun Fall (born 20 December 1990) is a French professional footballer who plays as a defender for Primera Divisió club Engordany.

Career
In August 2016, Fall joined Ajaccio.

Personal life 
Born in France, Fall is of Senegalese descent.

Career statistics

References

Living people
1990 births
People from Ollioules
Sportspeople from Var (department)
French sportspeople of Senegalese descent
French footballers
Association football defenders
Thonon Evian Grand Genève F.C. players
AC Ajaccio players
SC Toulon players
UE Engordany players
Ligue 1 players
Ligue 2 players
French expatriate footballers
French expatriate sportspeople in Andorra
Expatriate footballers in Andorra
Footballers from Provence-Alpes-Côte d'Azur